Katharine Parnell (née Wood; 30 January 1846 – 5 February 1921), known before her second marriage as Katharine O'Shea, and usually called Katie O'Shea by friends and Kitty O'Shea by enemies, was an English woman of aristocratic background whose decade-long secret affair with Charles Stewart Parnell led to a widely publicized divorce in 1890 and his political downfall.

Background
Katharine was born in Braintree, Essex, on 30 January 1846, the daughter of Sir John Page Wood, 2nd Baronet (1796–1866), and granddaughter of Sir Matthew Wood, a former Lord Mayor of London. She had an elder brother who became Field Marshal Sir Evelyn Wood and was also the niece of both Western Wood MP (1804–1863) and Lord Hatherley, Gladstone's first Liberal Lord Chancellor.

Relationship with Parnell
In 1867, Katharine married Captain William O'Shea, a Catholic Nationalist MP for County Clare from whom she separated around 1875. Katharine first met Parnell in 1880 and began an affair with him. Three of Katharine's children were fathered by Parnell; the first, Claude Sophie, died early in 1882. The others were Claire (born 1883) and Katharine (born 1884). Captain O'Shea knew about the relationship. He challenged Parnell to a duel in 1881 and initially forbade his estranged wife to see him, although she said that he encouraged her in the relationship. However, he kept publicly quiet for several years. Although their relationship was a subject of gossip in London political circles from 1881, later public knowledge of the affair in an England governed by "Victorian morality" with a "nonconformist conscience" created a huge scandal, as adultery was prohibited by the Ten Commandments.

Out of her family connection to the Liberal Party, Katharine acted as liaison between Parnell and Gladstone during negotiations prior to the introduction of the First Irish Home Rule Bill in April 1886. Parnell moved to her home in Eltham, close to the London-Kent border, that summer.

Captain O'Shea filed for divorce in 1889; his reasons are a matter for speculation. He may have had political motives. Alternatively, it was claimed that he had been hoping for an inheritance from Katharine's rich aunt whom he had expected to die earlier, but when she died in 1889 her money was left in trust to cousins. After the divorce the court awarded custody of Katharine O'Shea and C.S. Parnell's two surviving daughters to her ex-husband.

Katharine's November divorce proceedings from Captain O'Shea, in which Parnell was named as co-respondent, led to Parnell's being deserted by a majority of his own Irish Parliamentary Party and to his downfall as its leader in December 1890. Catholic Ireland felt a profound sense of shock when Katharine broke the vows of her previous Catholic marriage by marrying Parnell on 25 June 1891. With both his political life and his health essentially ruined, Parnell died in her arms at the age of 45 on 6 October 1891 in Hove, less than four months after their marriage. The cause was cancer of the stomach, possibly complicated by coronary heart disease inherited from his grandfather and father, who also died prematurely.

Katharine published a biography of Parnell in 1914 as "Katharine O'Shea (Mrs. Charles Stewart Parnell)".

Though to her friends she was known as Katie O'Shea, Parnell's enemies, in order to damage him personally, called her Kitty O'Shea because at that time "kitty", as well as being a Hiberno-English version of Catherine/Katherine/Katharine, was also a slang term for a prostitute. She lived the rest of her life in relative obscurity and is buried in Littlehampton, West Sussex, England.

Her daughter by Parnell, Claire O'Shea (1883–1909), married Dr. Bertram Sydney Osmund Maunsell, and their only son, Assheton Clare Bowyer-Lane Maunsell (1909–34), died of enteric fever while serving with the British army in India. Katharine’s other daughter by Parnell, Katharine O'Shea (1884–1947), married Arthur Moule of the East Lancashire Regiment and died in an asylum.

Captain Henry Harrison, MP, who had acted as Parnell's bodyguard and aide-de-camp, devoted himself after Parnell's death to the service of his widow, Katharine. From her he heard a completely different version of the events surrounding the divorce from that which had appeared in the press, and this was to form the seed of his later two books defending Parnell published in 1931 and 1938. They had a major impact on Irish historiography, leading to a more favourable view of Parnell's role in the O’Shea affair.

References

Sources
 O'Shea, Katharine (1914) Charles Stewart Parnell. London: Cassell
 Harrison, Henry (1931) Parnell Vindicated: the lifting of the veil. London: Constable
 Kehoe, Elisabeth (2008) Ireland's Misfortune: The Turbulent Life of Kitty O'Shea. London: Atlantic Books

External links

 
 Katharine O'Shea on Women of Brighton site
 Archive on Parnell including photos of O'Shea

1845 births
1921 deaths
Daughters of baronets
People from Braintree, Essex
Women of the Victorian era